Georgios Ambet (born 1891, date of death unknown) was a Greek fencer. He competed in three events at the 1928 Summer Olympics.

References

External links

1891 births
Year of death missing
Greek male fencers
Olympic fencers of Greece
Fencers at the 1928 Summer Olympics
Sportspeople from Athens